Robert Lanier may refer to:
Bob Lanier (1948–2022), American basketball player and coach
Bob Lanier (politician) (1925–2014), American politician
Rob Lanier (born 1968), American basketball coach